Allan MacKinnon (1912-1980) was a British screenwriter.

Selected filmography
 This Man Is News (1938)
 Let's Be Famous (1939)
 Cheer Boys Cheer (1939)
 This Man in Paris (1940)
 Unpublished Story (1942)
 Sleeping Car to Trieste (1948)
 Vote for Huggett (1949)
 Song of Paris (1952)
 The Saint's Return (1953)
 The Men of Sherwood Forest (1954)
 Behind the Headlines (1956)
 Second Fiddle (1957)

References

External links

1912 births
1980 deaths
British male screenwriters
20th-century British screenwriters